Alliance for Hippocratic Medicine v. U.S. Food and Drug Administration, No. 2:22-cv-00223-Z, is a 2022 case in the US District Court for the Northern District of Texas, Amarillo Division, challenging the U.S Food and Drug Agency's approval of mifepristone, a drug frequently used in medical abortion procedures. The plaintiff, the Alliance for Hippocratic Medicine (AHM), argues that the FDA’s approval of mifepristone for pregnancy termination was impermissible under the Federal Food, Drug, and Cosmetic Act and asks for an injunction to immediately suspend its approval, removing it from the market. The judge overseeing the case is Matthew J. Kacsmaryk.

Background

Medication abortion 
Medication abortion, in which prescription medications are used to induce abortion of the embryo, typically occurs with a mixture of two different drugs—mifepristone and misoprostol. Mifepriston was approved by the United States' Food and Drug Administration (FDA) in September 2000. Medication abortion accounts for over half of all abortions in the United States.

Mifepristone was highly regulated under the FDA's Risk Evaluation and Mitigation Strategy and was not available at commercial pharmacies, instead only available via in-person pickup at hospitals or other medical facilities. This changed in April 2021, as the FDA, in response to lack of access to medical care from the COVID-19 pandemic, allowed mifepristone to be obtained through mail-order pharmacies. This opened access to mifepristone across the United States under the FDA's authority and the standing right to abortion from Roe v. Wade

However, in June 2022, the United States Supreme Court ruled to overturn Roe in the case Dobbs v. Jackson Women's Health Organization, stating there was no federal right to abortion and instead the restrictions or protections for abortions could be decided at the state level. Among other state laws passed to restrict abortions, several states also passed laws to prevent the sale of mifepristone into that state.

Plaintiffs 
The Alliance for Hippocratic Medicine (AHM) describes itself as "uphold[ing] and promot[ing] the fundamental principles of Hippocratic medicine," which "include protecting the vulnerable at the beginning and end of life." AHM was founded in August 2022, three months after the Dobbs ruling in June, and incorporated in Amarillo, Texas. A piece in The Intercept describes it as a front group for the Catholic Medical Association, the Coptic Medical Association of North America, the American College of Pediatricians, the Christian Medical & Dental Associations, and the American Association of Pro-Life Obstetricians and Gynecologists.

The Christian legal advocacy group Alliance Defending Freedom (ADF) are representing the Alliance for Hippocratic Medicine. The ADF played a crucial role in the overturning of Roe v. Wade and helped to draft the law at issue in Dobbs, Mississippi's 2018 Gestational Age Act.

Procedural history 
The judge overseeing the case is Matthew J. Kacsmaryk, nominated to the Texas District Court in Amarillo in 2017 by President Donald Trump. Kacsmaryk has been described as a "devout Christian" and reliably conservative judge, whose opinions challenge the Biden administration on issues of immigration policy, LGBTQ rights and abortion. The AHM filed the case in Kacsmaryk's Texas division, where he is the only judge, leading to accusations of "judge shopping," or "forum shopping", where plaintiffs select legal venues most likely to deliver favorable rulings.

Kacsmaryk had also sought to keep the hearing off the docket, citing concerns about potential protests over the hearing. When this was discovered, Kacsmaryk agreed to announce the trial dates, with the first session on March 15, 2023.

References 

Politics
Law of the United States
United_States_abortion_law